Leporacanthicus heterodon is a species of armored catfish endemic to Brazil where it occurs in the Xingu River basin.  This species grows to a length of  SL.

References 
 
 Entry at Planet Catfish

Ancistrini
Fish of South America
Fish of Brazil
Endemic fauna of Brazil
Fish described in 1989